John Garrison Marks (born March 22, 1948) is a Canadian former professional ice hockey player. He most recently worked as the head coach of the Fargo Force of the United States Hockey League.

Career 
Marks spent his 657-game NHL career with the Chicago Black Hawks, recording 112 goals and 163 assists for 275 points, as well as accumulating 330 penalty minutes.

From 1998 to 2006, he was the only head coach of the now-defunct Greenville Grrrowl of the ECHL. In 2002, he guided the South Carolina-based team to their only league championship in a four-game sweep of the Dayton Bombers; this was the first (and currently only) time an ECHL team has swept the Kelly Cup finals. With the victory, Marks also became the first coach in ECHL history to win two championships with two different teams.

For the 2006–07 season he was the head coach of the Fayetteville FireAntz of the Southern Professional Hockey League, leading the team to the President's Cup by taking first place in the playoffs. The championship was the first for the FireAntz as well as the first for the city of Fayetteville in 51 years.

Until they folded midway through the 2008–09 season, Marks was the head coach of the Augusta Lynx of the ECHL. He was also the head coach and director of player personnel for the Dayton Gems of the International Hockey League for the 2008–09 season.

On May 10, 2010, Marks was announced as the new head coach of the Winkler Flyers of the Manitoba Major Junior Hockey League. Marks became the head coach of the USHL's Fargo Force on July 18, 2011.

On December 1, 2011, it was announced that Marks would be inducted into the 2012 Class of the ECHL Hall of Fame.

Personal life 
Marks has two children.

Career statistics

Awards and honours as player

CHL Championship (1972)
Played in NHL All-Star Game (1976)
NCAA Championship (1987)
Riley Cup winner (1996)
Kelly Cup winner (2002)
"Honoured Member" of the Manitoba Hockey Hall of Fame
ECHL Hall of Fame (2012)

Awards and honours as coach

References

External links

Profile at hockeydraftcentral.com

1948 births
Living people
Canadian ice hockey defencemen
Chicago Blackhawks draft picks
Chicago Blackhawks players
Dallas Black Hawks players
ECHL coaches
Ice hockey people from Manitoba
Kalamazoo Wings (1974–2000) players
National Hockey League first-round draft picks
North Dakota Fighting Hawks men's ice hockey players
St. James Braves players
Ice hockey in Dayton, Ohio
Canadian ice hockey coaches
AHCA Division I men's ice hockey All-Americans